WNFC is a radio station airing a Religious format licensed to Paducah, Kentucky, broadcasting on 91.7 MHz FM. The station is owned by Somerset Educational Broadcasting Foundation.

History 
The station previously served as a full-time simulcast of former sister station WJCR-FM of Upton, Kentucky. The station now serves as part of the King of Kings Radio Network of Somerset, Kentucky.

References

External links
WNFC's official website

NFC
Paducah, Kentucky